All twenty-three of states of Venezuela count with their own state anthems, which have been adopted over the course of time by the states' local governments. The anthems are considered symbols of each state alongside their flags, coats of arms and representative trees.

The country's national anthem is Gloria al Bravo Pueblo ("Glory to the Brave People"), written by Vicente Salias in 1810 and adopted in 1881.

State anthems

Other anthems
Anthem of the Baruta Municipality

See also
List of flags of Venezuela
Symbols of Venezuela

Notes 

Anthems of Venezuela
A
Venezuela